Ron Corbett (born October 12, 1960) is an American politician and former mayor of Cedar Rapids, Iowa.

Early life and education
Corbett was born in Erie, Pennsylvania, in 1960. In 1974, his family moved to Iowa and he later graduated from Cornell College in Mount Vernon, Iowa, in 1983.

Career
After graduation, Corbett worked for The Equitable Life Insurance Company as an agent for ten years. In 1986 he was elected to the Iowa House of Representatives, where he served 7 terms. He was Speaker of the House from 1995 to 1999. He then resigned his House seat to become president of the Cedar Rapids Area Chamber of Commerce. He left that position for a Cedar Rapids-based international trucking firm, CRST, working directly under executive director John Smith.

He was elected mayor of Cedar Rapids in 2009 with 62% of the vote. He was reelected to another four-year term in 2013. In December 2016, he announced that he would not seek reelection for mayor of Cedar Rapids but would instead consider a run for the Republican nomination for governor of Iowa in 2018.

In 2015, he resigned from CRST and launched Engage Iowa, a conservative think tank of which he serves as president. Its first policy initiative, on water quality and state tax reform, was introduced in November 2015.

References

External links
Corbett's city of Cedar Rapids page

Politicians from Erie, Pennsylvania
Speakers of the Iowa House of Representatives
Republican Party members of the Iowa House of Representatives
Mayors of Cedar Rapids, Iowa
Cornell College alumni
1960 births
Living people
21st-century American politicians